Ananthagiri is a village in Alluri Sitharama Raju district in the state of Andhra Pradesh in India.

References 

Villages in Alluri Sitharama Raju district]